The Aper Tief is a stream in Lower Saxony, Germany.

It flows through the municipalities of Apen (district of Ammerland) and Detern in the collective municipality of Jümme (district of Leer). It begins west of Apen at the confluence of the Große Süderbäke and the Große Norderbäke, runs roughly east–west and empties south of the municipality of Detern into the Jümme. The Aper Tief is tidal. Its tidal range is about three quarters of a metre.

See also 
List of rivers of Lower Saxony

Literature 
 Dipl.-Ing. Richard Eckhoff, Hilke Hinrichs: Das Aper Tief darf wieder das Bett verlassen. In: gewässer-info, Nr. 53, January 2012, pp. 569–571 (pdf file, 3.2 MB)

References

External links 

 Naturschutzgebiet „Aper Tief“ beim Niedersächsischen Landesbetrieb für Wasserwirtschaft, Küsten- und Naturschutz

Rivers of Lower Saxony
Ammerland
Nature reserves in Lower Saxony
Flood control in Germany
Natural regions of Germany
Rivers of Germany